Mikel Aguirrezabalaga (born 8 April 1984) is a Spanish handball player. At the 2012 Summer Olympics he competed with the Spain men's national handball team in the men's tournament.

References

Living people
1984 births
Handball players at the 2012 Summer Olympics
Olympic handball players of Spain
Spanish male handball players
Liga ASOBAL players
FC Barcelona Handbol players
CB Ademar León players
Sportspeople from Gipuzkoa
People from Zarautz
Handball players from the Basque Country (autonomous community)
21st-century Spanish people